Bom (Boomo) is a rural locality (an ulus) in Mukhorshibirsky District, Republic of Buryatia, Russia. The population was 367 as of 2010. There are 9 streets.

Geography 
Bom is located 43 km northeast of Mukhorshibir (the district's administrative centre) by road. Tugnuy is the nearest rural locality.

References 

Rural localities in Mukhorshibirsky District